The World Minifootball Federation (WMF) is highest global authority for 6-a-side, with 5 a-side, 7 a-side, 8 a-side, and arena soccer disciplines version of minifootball (also called arena soccer). WMF exists to promote, supervise and direct minifootball growth. Its members are worldwide national minifootball teams and continental minifootball federations.

History 
Minifootball leagues and other events are organized by WMF and its continental, national or local affiliates. The best teams from local leagues will advance to national championships. With the World Cup scheduled every two years, WMF also hosts the Continental Cup (top five nations of each federation), U23 World Cup, Women's World Cup and Champions Cup (top clubs of each federation), among other events.

In November 2013 it was announced that WMF World Cup would be hosted in the United States. United States defeated Mexico 5–3 in the 2015 Final.

The second edition of the WMF World Cup was played in Tunisia in October 2017.

Continental federations 
 African Minifootball Federation (AMF)
 Asian Minifootball Confederation (AMC)
 European Minifootball Federation (EMF)
 Oceania Minifootball Federation (OMF)
 Panamerican Minifootball Federation (PAMF)

Competitions 

 2015 World Cup, men, seniors, USA
 2017 World Cup, men, seniors, Tunisia
 2018 World Cup, men, juniors, Czech Republic
 2019 World Cup, men, seniors, Australia
 2021 World Cup, women, seniors, Ukraine
 2021 World Cup, men, juniors, Ukraine

See also
International Socca Federation

References

External links 
 Official WMF website

Minifootball
International sports organizations
Sports organizations established in 2008